Turrisipho fenestratus is a species of sea snail, a marine gastropod mollusk in the family Colidae, the true whelks and the like.

Description

The length of the shell attains .

Distribution
This marine species occurs off Iceland

References

External links
 Turton W. (1834). Description of some nondescript and rare British species of shells. Magazine of Natural History 7: 350-353
 Broderip, W.J. (1830). Description of two new species of Buccinum from the English and Irish seas. The Zoological Journal. 5: 44-46
 Locard, A. (1897-1898). Expéditions scientifiques du Travailleur et du Talisman pendant les années 1880, 1881, 1882 et 1883. Mollusques testacés. Paris, Masson
 Bouchet, P. & Warén, A. (1985). Revision of the Northeast Atlantic bathyal and abyssal Neogastropoda excluding Turridae (Mollusca, Gastropoda). Bollettino Malacologico. supplement 1: 121-296

Colidae
Gastropods described in 1834
Taxa named by William Turton